Darreh Nakhi (also Romanized as Darreh Nākhī, Darreh Nakhī, and Darreh-ye Nākhī; also known as Darreh Nākheh) is a village in Dezli Rural District, in the Central District of Sarvabad County, Kurdistan Province, Iran. At the 2006 census, its population was 529, in 118 families. The village is populated by Kurds.

References 

Towns and villages in Sarvabad County
Kurdish settlements in Kurdistan Province